Mohammad Ghaderi (born 27 February 2000) is an Iranian footballer who plays as a midfielder for Persian Gulf Pro League side Tractor.

Career statistics

Club

Notes

Honours

International 
Iran U16
 AFC U-16 Championship runner-up: 2016

References

External links 

 

2000 births
Living people
Iranian footballers
Persian Gulf Pro League players
Machine Sazi F.C. players
Association football midfielders
People from Hormozgan Province